Statistics of Czechoslovak First League in the 1952 season.

Overview
It was contested by 14 teams, and Sparta ČKD Sokolovo won the championship. Miroslav Wiecek was the league's top scorer with 20 goals.

Stadia and locations

League standings

Results

Top goalscorers

References

Czechoslovakia - List of final tables (RSSSF)

Czechoslovak First League seasons
Czech
Czech
1
1